The 1966–67 DFB-Pokal was the 24th season of the annual German football cup competition. It began on 25 December 1966 and ended on 10 June 1967. 32 teams competed in the tournament of five rounds. In the final Bayern Munich defeated Hamburg 4–0, thus defending their title from the previous season.

Matches

Qualification round

First round

Replays

Round of 16

Replays

Quarter-finals

Replay

Semi-finals

Final

References

External links
 Official site of the DFB 
 Kicker.de 
 1967 results at Fussballdaten.de 
 1967 results at Weltfussball.de 

1966-67
1966–67 in German football cups